Emily Nichole Kukors (born April 13, 1985) is an American former competition swimmer. She is a 19-time All-American and a three-time SEC Champion. Kukors won three medals for her native country at the 2007 Pan American Games in Rio de Janeiro, Brazil.  In March 2010, she became a swim coach for Redlands Swim Team.

References
 
 Redlands Swim Team: Coaches & Directors

External links
 
 Emily Kukors at Auburn University Athletics

1985 births
Living people
American female freestyle swimmers
American female medley swimmers
Auburn Tigers women's swimmers
People from Auburn, Washington
Swimmers at the 2007 Pan American Games
Pan American Games gold medalists for the United States
Pan American Games medalists in swimming
Medalists at the 2007 Pan American Games
21st-century American women